The 1994 Ivy League Baseball Championship Series took place at Palmer Field in Middletown, Connecticut, on May 7 and 8, 1994.  The series matched the regular season champions of each of the league's two divisions.  , the winner of the series, claimed their second title in the two years of the event and the Ivy League's automatic berth in the 1994 NCAA Division I baseball tournament.

It was Penn's first appearance in the Championship Series.

Results

References

Ivy League Baseball Championship Series
Ivy League Baseball Championship Series
Ivy League Championship Series